Vete Vete... is the fourth studio album of Puerto Rican singer Ednita Nazario. It was released in 1977.

Track listing
 "Mi Remedio Es Cantar"
 "Abrázame"
 "Como Es Grande Mi Amor Por Ti"
 "Ya, Ya... (Déjame En Paz)"
 "Verde Amor" (Ever Green)
 "Yo Lo Siento Ahora" (Sir Duke)
 "Vete Vete"
 "Aquí Estoy Yo"

Personnel
 Produced by Darío González

References 

Ednita Nazario albums
1977 albums